is a Japanese cyclist. He competed in two events at the 2000 Summer Olympics.

References

External links
 

1975 births
Living people
Japanese male cyclists
Olympic cyclists of Japan
Cyclists at the 2000 Summer Olympics
Sportspeople from Saitama Prefecture
Cyclists at the 2002 Asian Games
Asian Games medalists in cycling
Medalists at the 2002 Asian Games
Asian Games gold medalists for Japan